Bellaspira virginiana is an extinct species of sea snail, a marine gastropod mollusk in the family Drilliidae.

Description
The length of the shell attains 14 mm. The shell is subfusiform and is longitudinally ribbed. The eight ribs are distant. The shell shows very minute, close revolving lines, which become gradually more distinct on the body whorl. The siphonal canal is very short. The simple and entire outer lip is obsoletely, widely notched and curved outwards. The lip is reflexed and slightly callous near the upper extremity. The columella is straight.

Distribution
This extinct species was found in Miocene strata off Yorktown, Virginia, USA.

References

Conrad, Acad. Nat. Sci. Philadelphia Proc. for 1862, p. 286.

External links
 J. A. Gardner. 1948. Mollusca from the Miocene and Lower Pliocene of Virginia and North Carolina: Part 2. Scaphopoda and Gastropoda. United States Geological Survey Professional Paper 199(B):179–310

virginiana